Cupid? is the first album by Canadian rock band Stabilo with a major record label and their first with their new modified name (originally "Stabilo Boss"). It contains seven songs, including the hit "Everybody". The songs "Stone", "Any Other Girl" and "Enemy" were new songs recorded specifically for the album. "Paperboy", "Everybody", "One More Pill" and "?" were re-recordings of older material.

Track listing
"Paperboy" – 3:26
"Everybody" – 3:35
"Stone" – 3:53
"Any Other Girl" – 4:44
"One More Pill" – 3:49
"?" – 4:27
"Enemy" – 3:42

Stabilo (band) albums
2004 albums
Cupid in music